Psednotrichia is a genus of Angolan flowering plants in the groundsel tribe within the sunflower family.

 Species
 Psednotrichia newtonii (O.Hoffm.) Anderb. & P.O.Karis 
 Psednotrichia perennis N.G.Bergh & B Nord.
 Psednotrichia xyridopsis (O.Hoffm.) Anderb. & P.O.Karis 
	
 formerly included
Psednotrichia australis Alston - Felicia australis (Alston) E.Phillips

References

Senecioneae
Asteraceae genera
Endemic flora of Angola